Stephanie D. Howse (born August 21, 1979) is an American politician serving as a member of the Cleveland City Council from the 7th ward. She was previously a member of the Ohio House of Representatives from 2015 to 2022.

Early life and education 
Howse was raised in Cleveland, and is the daughter of former Representative Annie L. Key. Howse is a graduate of the Cleveland School of the Arts, where she studied vocal and instrumental music. After high school, Howse earned a Bachelor of Science degree in civil and environmental engineering from Florida A&M University and a Master of Science in environmental studies from Cleveland State University.

Career 
Howse briefly served as a member of the Cleveland City Council in 2008. From 2015 to 2022, she represented the 11th district of the Ohio House of Representatives. In 2021, Howse was elected to the Cleveland City Council and resigned from the House.

References

External links 
The Ohio House of Representatives: Rep. Stephanie D. Howse (D-Cleveland) official site
Official Campaign Website

1979 births
Living people
Democratic Party members of the Ohio House of Representatives
Politicians from Cleveland
Women state legislators in Ohio
African-American state legislators in Ohio
African-American women in politics
21st-century American politicians
21st-century American women politicians
Florida A&M University alumni
Cleveland State University alumni
21st-century African-American women
21st-century African-American politicians
20th-century African-American people
20th-century African-American women